The 1975 Boston Red Sox season was the 75th season in the franchise's Major League Baseball history. The Red Sox finished first in the American League East with a record of 95 wins and 65 losses. Following a sweep of the Oakland Athletics in the ALCS, the Red Sox lost the World Series to the Cincinnati Reds in seven games.

Offseason

Long expectations 

The 1975 baseball season should have dawned for Red Sox fans with bright hopes. The team had made a legitimate run for the pennant the previous year, and this time the team had Carlton Fisk and Rick Wise for full seasons. Rick Burleson had surprised everyone by playing outstanding shortstop and hitting higher in the majors than he ever had in the minors. In addition, the Sox had two rookies who gave every indication they would be phenoms, Fred Lynn and Jim Rice. But the memory of the collapse of 1974 still hung heavy over New England fans.

At first most of the preseason talk had to do with the decision by Tony Conigliaro to try one more comeback and with the salary hassle concerning Luis Tiant, who felt he deserved more than $70,000 he was earning and wouldn't show up at Winter Haven, Florida, causing team owner Tom Yawkey to meet with "El Tiante", agree on a raise (to $90,000) and get the Sox pitching ace back in camp.

Still, it didn't take too long before the stories and pictures coming out of Florida about the two phenoms got Sox fans thinking. The betting lines in Las Vegas had Boston as a long shot, although not the 100–1 shot they were in 1967. The odds against them went up, however, after Fisk, returning from the serious knee injury of 1974, was hit in the right arm and broke it. Even the positive talk about young Mr. Lynn couldn't drive away the gloom over Fisk's injury. Catching is absolutely vital to a successful team, and Fisk was going to be sidelined for at least a couple of months.

Youngsters and comebacks 

The word out of Florida on Lynn was very positive. The young man who had gone to the USC as a football linebacker, but gave up football for baseball, seemed to be doing it all. Not only did he hit and run and field, he was a good-looking, charming young man. He was a hit with Boston and New England fans and hit with power, and with the way big Jim Rice was clobbering the baseball, Boston appeared to have a power punch that could only get better when Fisk got back into the lineup.

Rick Wise, back after a year of shoulder trouble and then a broken finger, looked ready to boost a pitching staff, which already had Luis Tiant, Bill Lee, Reggie Cleveland, and the stringbean flame-thrower Roger Moret. The bullpen also looked strong, with Dick Drago as the closer and hard-thrower Dick Pole and veteran Diego Seguí.

Additionally, the word on Tony Conigliaro was encouraging, and that boosted spirits back home. Carl Yastrzemski was at first base, and after three short trials in previous years Cecil Cooper was going to make this team and probably be the designated hitter.

Notable transactions 
 October 24, 1974: Juan Marichal was released by the Red Sox.
 March 29, 1975: Danny Cater was traded by the Red Sox to the St. Louis Cardinals for Danny Godby.

Regular season 

The Red Sox played only 160 games, as two games against the Yankees were rained out in the final week of the season, and not rescheduled once Boston clinched the AL East title.

Season standings

Record vs. opponents

Notable transactions 
 June 3: Dave Schmidt was selected by the Red Sox in the 2nd round of the 1975 Major League Baseball Draft
 June 14: The Red Sox traded a player to be named later and cash to the California Angels for Denny Doyle. The Red Sox completed the deal by sending Chuck Ross (minors) to the Angels on March 5, 1976.

Opening Day lineup 

Source:

Boston's Opening Day opponent was the Milwaukee Brewers, then a member of the AL East; the game was notable for being the first game that Hank Aaron played in the American League, having previously played from 1954 through 1974 in the National League.

Roster

Player stats

Batting

Starters by position 
Note: Pos = Position; G = Games played; AB = At bats; H = Hits; Avg. = Batting average; HR = Home runs; RBI = Runs batted in

Other batters 
Note: G = Games played; AB = At bats; H = Hits; Avg. = Batting average; HR = Home runs; RBI = Runs batted in

Pitching

Starting pitchers 
Note: G = Games pitched; IP = Innings pitched; W = Wins; L = Losses; ERA = Earned run average; SO = Strikeouts

Other pitchers 
Note: G = Games pitched; IP = Innings pitched; W = Wins; L = Losses; ERA = Earned run average; SO = Strikeouts

Relief pitchers 
Note: G = Games pitched; W = Wins; L = Losses; SV = Saves; ERA = Earned run average; SO = Strikeouts

Postseason 

After a great season, The Red Sox continued their magical season by sweeping the Oakland Athletics in three games in the American League Championship Series to advance to their first World Series since 1967.

In the historic World Series that followed, it came down to Carl Yastrzemski with the Red Sox trailing, 4–3, with two outs in the ninth inning of Game 7. Yaz's drive fell into the hands of Reds outfielder César Gerónimo, and Boston's magical season fell one game short. Boston would not return to the World Series until 1986.

ALCS

Game 1 
October 4 at Fenway Park

Game 2 
October 5 at Fenway Park

Game 3

World Series 

The Red Sox scored first in six of the seven World Series games, only to see the Reds come back and win four of those games, spoiling Boston's chances at their first championship since 1918. In Game 7, the Red Sox entered the sixth inning with a 3–0 lead, but the Reds rallied back to win the game, 4–3, and the series.

Awards and honors 
 Darrell Johnson – Associated Press AL Manager of the Year
 Fred Lynn – American League MVP, American League Rookie of the Year, Associated Press Athlete of the Year, Gold Glove Award (OF), AL Player of the Month (June)
 Luis Tiant – Babe Ruth Award

All-Star Game
 Fred Lynn, reserve OF
 Carl Yastrzemski, reserve 1B

Farm system 

LEAGUE CHAMPIONS: Bristol

Source:

References

External links 
1975 Boston Red Sox team page at Baseball Reference
1975 Boston Red Sox season at baseball-almanac.com
1975 ALCS Official Scorebook Magazine
1975 World Series Media Guide and Scorebook

Boston Red Sox seasons
Boston Red Sox
American League East champion seasons
American League champion seasons
Boston Red Sox
Red Sox